Sebastián Andrés Ubilla Cambón (born August 9, 1990) is a Chilean footballer who currently plays as a forward for C.D. Antofagasta in the Chilean Primera División.

Honours

Club
 Universidad de Chile
 Copa Chile (2): 2012–13, 2015
 Primera División de Chile (2): 2014 Apertura, 2017 Clausura
 Supercopa de Chile (1): 2015

Notes

References

External links
 
 

1990 births
Living people
People from Quilpué
Chilean footballers
Chilean expatriate footballers
Chile international footballers
Santiago Wanderers footballers
Universidad de Chile footballers
Al-Shabab FC (Riyadh) players
O'Higgins F.C. footballers
Chilean Primera División players
Primera B de Chile players
Saudi Professional League players
Chilean expatriate sportspeople in Saudi Arabia
Expatriate footballers in Saudi Arabia
Association football forwards